Karima Baloch (8 March 1983 – 20/22 December 2020), also known as Karima Mehrab, was a Baloch human rights activist and a dissident. She campaigned for the independence of Balochistan from Pakistan, and was included in the BBC's list of 100 inspirational and influential women in 2016.

Activist career 

Baloch started her career as a human rights and independence activist in 2005, when she attended a protest in Turbat over forced disappearances in the Pakistani province of Balochistan, where she carried a picture of one of her missing relatives. She joined the Baloch Students Organization (BSO) in 2006, serving in several different positions and eventually becoming the organization's chairperson in 2015. During these years, Baloch travelled all over Balochistan, organizing outreach programs such as protests and rallies. A 2014 OZY article about her states, "In Islamabad, Pakistan's capital, Karima is seen as a dangerous political actor and a threat to the nation’s security. Meanwhile, a thousand kilometers southwest, deep inside Balochistan, she's a local hero and a beacon of hope."

In an interview in 2014, she said,

Exile from Pakistan 
In 2015, Baloch went into self-imposed exile after terrorism charges were filed against her by the Pakistani state, with her younger sister Mahganj Baloch stating that, "She didn't go abroad because she wanted to, but because... open activism in Pakistan had become impossible." A year later, in 2016, she was granted asylum in Canada, where she lived until her disappearance and death in December 2020. In 2016, following Indian Prime Minister Narendra Modi's public speech on India's Independence Day in which he mentioned the situation in Pakistani Balochistan, Baloch addressed him in a video and thanked him for mentioning the issue, stating: "We will fight our own war, you just be our voice" .

Baloch was included in the 100 Women List by the BBC in 2016, where she was identified as a political activist who "campaigns for independence for Balochistan from Pakistan". Baloch listed Dad Shah and Hatun Bibi—both Baloch rebels who fought against the Imperial State of Iran in Iranian Balochistan—as the primary inspirations behind her activism. In 2018, she raised issues related to gender inequality in Pakistan at the United Nations Human Rights Council. She also raised issues related to Balochistan in Canada, such as during a meeting in Toronto, where she mentioned Pakistan's occupation of Balochistan.

Personal life and family
Baloch had two siblings, a brother named Sameer Mehrab and a sister named Mahganj Baloch. She married a fellow Baloch activist, Hammal Baloch (also known as Hammal Haider), in Toronto. Several members of her extended family have been linked to the Balochistan insurgency in Pakistan and Iran.

Disappearance and death 
Baloch was last seen alive on 20 December 2020. On 22 December 2020, her dead body was found submerged at the Toronto Waterfront. The Toronto Police Service initially reported that her body was found near Lake Ontario, although no further details were given. CBC News reported that a close friend and fellow Baloch activist, Lateef Johar, said that "officers had told her family she was found drowned in the water". Small-scale protests demanding an investigation into her death occurred in Pakistani Balochistan and Canada; ethnic Baloch, Pashtun and Sindhi minority groups in Canada issued a joint statement in this regard. Canadian police acknowledged the concerns around Baloch's death, but stated that they had found no evidence of foul play, and concluded that her death was "non-criminal". Chris Alexander, the former Canadian Minister of Immigration, Refugees and Citizenship, stated in a tweet: "All of us who knew Karima see the circumstances of her death as deeply suspicious. We must leave no stone unturned in uncovering & confronting the reality of what happened to her." CBC News documents the story of Baloch's activism and her death in the podcast The Kill List.

See also 

 Insurgency in Balochistan
 Human rights violations in Balochistan

References 

1983 births
2020 deaths
Baloch people
Baloch nationalists
Pakistani dissidents
Pakistani emigrants to Canada
Pakistani exiles
Pakistani human rights activists
Applicants for refugee status in Canada
BBC 100 Women